A separation process is a method that converts a mixture or a solution of chemical substances into two or more distinct product mixtures,  a scientific process of separating two or more substance in order to obtain purity. At least one product mixture from the separation is enriched in one or more of the source mixture's constituents. In some cases, a separation may fully divide the mixture into pure constituents.  Separations exploit differences in chemical properties or physical properties (such as size, shape, mass, density, or chemical affinity) between the constituents of a mixture.

Processes are often classified according to the particular properties they exploit to achieve separation. If no single difference can be used to accomplish the desired separation, multiple operations can often be combined to achieve the desired end.
 
With a few exceptions, elements or compounds exist in nature in an impure state.  Often these raw materials must go through a separation before they can be put to productive use, making separation techniques essential for the modern industrial economy.  

The purpose of separation may be:
 analytical: to identify the size of each fraction of a mixture is attributable to each component without attempting to harvest the fractions.
 preparative: to "prepare" fractions for input into processes that benefit when components are separated.

Separations may be performed on a small scale, as in a laboratory for analytical purposes, or on a large scale, as in a Chemical plant.

Complete and incomplete separation
Some types of separation require complete purification of a certain component. An example is the production of aluminum metal from bauxite ore through electrolysis refining. In contrast, an incomplete separation process may specify an output to consist of a mixture instead of a single pure component. A good example of an incomplete separation technique is oil refining. Crude oil occurs naturally as a mixture of various hydrocarbons and impurities. The refining process splits this mixture into other, more valuable mixtures such as natural gas, gasoline and chemical feedstocks, none of which are pure substances, but each of which must be separated from the raw crude.

In both cases of complete and incomplete separation, a series of separations may be necessary to obtain the desired end products. In the case of oil refining, crude is subjected to a long series of individual distillation steps, each of which produces a different product or intermediate.

List of separation techniques
Sponge, adhesion of atoms, ions or molecules of gas, liquid, or dissolved solids to a surface
Centrifugation and cyclonic separation, separates based on density differences
Chelation
Filtration 
Centrifugation

Chromatography
Chromatography separates dissolved substances by different interaction with (i.e., travel through) a material.
High-performance liquid chromatography (HPLC)
Thin-layer chromatography (TLC)
Countercurrent chromatography (CCC)
Droplet countercurrent chromatography (DCC)
Paper chromatography
Ion chromatography
Size-exclusion chromatography
Affinity chromatography
Centrifugal partition chromatography
Gas chromatography and Inverse gas chromatography

Crystallization
Decantation
Demister (vapor), removes liquid droplets from gas streams
Distillation, used for mixtures of liquids with different boiling points
Drying, removes liquid from a solid by vaporization or evaporation

Electrophoresis
Electrophoresis, separates organic molecules based on their different interaction with a gel under an electric potential (i.e., different travel)
Capillary electrophoresis

Electrostatic separation, works on the principle of corona discharge, where two plates are placed close together and high voltage is applied. This high voltage is used to separate the ionized particles.
Elutriation
Evaporation

Extraction
Extraction
Leaching
Liquid-liquid extraction
Solid phase extraction
Supercritical fluid extraction
Subcritical fluid extraction

Field flow fractionation

Flotation
Flotation
Dissolved air flotation, removes suspended solids non-selectively from slurry by bubbles that are generated by air coming out of solution
Froth flotation, recovers valuable, hydrophobic solids by attachment to air bubbles generated by mechanical agitation of an air-slurry mixture, which floats, and are recovered
Deinking, separating hydrophobic ink particles from the hydrophilic paper pulp in paper recycling

Flocculation, separates a solid from a liquid in a colloid, by use of a flocculant, which promotes the solid clumping into flocs
Filtration – Mesh, bag and paper filters are used to remove large particulates suspended in fluids (e.g., fly ash) while membrane processes including microfiltration, ultrafiltration, nanofiltration, reverse osmosis, dialysis (biochemistry) utilising synthetic membranes, separates micrometre-sized or smaller species
Fractional distillation
Fractional freezing
Oil-water separation, gravimetrically separates suspended oil droplets from waste water in oil refineries, petrochemical and chemical plants, natural gas processing plants and similar industries
Magnetic separation
Precipitation
Recrystallization
Scrubbing, separation of particulates (solids) or gases from a gas stream using liquid.
Sedimentation, separates using vocal density pressure differences
Gravity separation
Sieving
Stripping
Sublimation
Vapor-liquid separation, separates by gravity, based on the Souders-Brown equation
Winnowing
Zone refining

See also

References

Further reading

External links
Separation of Mixtures Using Different Techniques , instructions for performing classroom experiments
Separation of Components of a Mixture , instructions for performing classroom experiments

Analytical chemistry
Unit operations
Separation processes